The 1st Parachute Battalion was a unit of the Royal Hungarian Army that participated in the Axis invasion of Yugoslavia during World War II.

Notes

References

 

Military units and formations of Hungary in World War II
Parachuting in Hungary